This is a list of notable psychobilly bands and artists. Psychobilly is a fusion genre of rock music that mixes elements of punk rock, rockabilly, and other genres. It is one of several subgenres of rockabilly which also include thrashabilly, punkabilly, surfabilly and gothabilly. Bands and artists are listed according to their name without any preceding "The".



0–9
The 5.6.7.8's
7 Shot Screamers

A
Hasil Adkins
Assjack (early work)

B

Batmobile
Big John Bates
Bodeco
Brain Dead
The Brains

C
Calamitiez
Calavera
The Caravans
The Chop Tops
The Cramps
The Creepshow
Calabrese

D
Deadbolt
Demented Are Go
Devil's Brigade

E
The Eighties Matchbox B-Line Disaster
Elvis Hitler

F
Fireballs
Fireball XL5
Flat Duo Jets
Flesh Roxon
The Fleshtones

G
The Go-Katz
Guana Batz

H
The Hangmen
The Highliners
Hilera
HorrorPops

K
King Kurt
Klingonz

L
The Limit Club
The Living End

Los Saicos

M
Mad Heads
Mad Sin
The Meteors
Mojo Nixon

N
Nekromantix
Nitkie

P
Panther Burns 
The Phenomenauts
Pitmen
The P.O.X.

Q
The Quakes

R
Radarmen
Red Elvises
The Reverend Horton Heat
Ripmen
Ruby Joe

S

The Silver Shine
Speed Crazy
Stellar Corpses
The Sting-rays
Swamptrash
Switchblade Valentines

T
The Termites
The Thirsty Crows
Tiger Army

V
The Voidz
Volbeat

W
Hank Williams III
Les Wampas

Y
The Young Werewolves

Z
Zombie Ghost Train

References

 
Lists of punk bands